Governor of Belgorod Oblast is the highest official and the head of the executive power of Belgorod Oblast, a region in Central Russia.

History of office 
The office of the Head of Administration was introduced in Russia in August 1991 during the downfall of the Soviet Union. Administrations and their Heads were supposed to replace Soviet executive committees (ispolkoms) and their chairmen. The first head of Belgorod Oblast Administration Viktor Berestovoy was appointed by president Boris Yeltsin in November 1991. Two years later he was removed from office for his support of the Supreme Soviet and Vice President Alexander Rutskoy in the 1993 constitutional crisis.

Berestovoy's successor Yevgeny Savchenko, had previously worked as deputy head of the Main Directorate of Crop Production of the Ministry of Agriculture. In office from October 1993 to September 2020, he is the longest-serving Russian governor in post-Soviet history.

List of office-holders

Timeline

References

Politics of Belgorod Oblast
Belgorod